is a railway station on the Tsugaru Railway Line in the city of Goshogawara, Aomori, Japan, operated by the private railway operator Tsugaru Railway Company.

Lines

Station layout
The station has dual opposed ground-level side platforms serving two tracks, connected by a level crossing. The station is staffed.

Platforms

History
Kanagi Station was opened on July 15, 1930 with the opening of the Tsugary Railway Line. The station building was rebuilt on December 25, 2003.

Surrounding area
Kanagi Post Office
Osamu Dazai Memorial Museum

See also
 List of railway stations in Japan

References

External links

 

Railway stations in Aomori Prefecture
Tsugaru Railway Line
Goshogawara
Railway stations in Japan opened in 1930